Uravugal Sangamam  is a soap opera that aired on Raj TV. The show premiered on 14 October 2013 and aired Monday through Saturaday at 9:30pm and the show was shifted to 8:30pm time Slot. The show starring by Yuvarani, Vadivukkarasi, Shyam Ganesh, Durga, Pooja, Devikiruba, Nagalakshmi, S.Kavitha, Dev, Abser, Ajay Rathnam and Pandu. The story revolved around the families, especially, the three families, which were considered as main in the serial.

The serial is produced by Bharathi Associates and directed by Vijay. S.Kumar. The serial had the privilege of actress Sukanya lending her voice to the title song, for the music scored by Babu Ganesh. The show last aired on 13 September 2014 and ended with 375 episodes.

Plot

Cast

 Srithika
 Bharathi
 Yuvarani
 Vadivukkarasi
 Shyam Ganesh
 Abser
 Venkat
 Durga
 Pooja
 Devikiruba
 Nagalakshmi
  S.Kavitha
 Dev
 Ajay Rathnam
 Pandu
 Azhagu
 Nithya
 Sujatha
 Kumaresan
 Shanthi Williams
 Rajsekar
 Shobana
 Ramya

International broadcast
  It also aired in Sri Lanka Tamil Channel on Nethra TV.

References

External links
 Raj TV Official Site 
 Raj TV on YouTube
 Raj Television Network

Raj TV television series
2013 Tamil-language television series debuts
Tamil-language television shows
2014 Tamil-language television series endings